The 1996 Western Samoa rugby union tour of New Zealand was a series of rugby union matches played during May and June 1996 in New Zealand by the Western Samoa national rugby union team.

Results 
Scores and results list Western Samoa's points tally first.

References

1996 rugby union tours
1996
1996 in New Zealand rugby union
1996
1996 in Oceanian rugby union
rugby union